Odiljon Hamrobekov or Xamrobekov (born 13 February 1996) is an Uzbek football midfielder who plays for Pakhtakor Tashkent and the Uzbekistan national football team.

Career

Club
On 23 July 2021, Hamrobekov returned to Pakhtakor Tashkent, signing a contract until the end of 2022.

International
Hamrobekov made his international debut for Uzbekistan on November 14, 2017, during a friendly match against United Arab Emirates.

Career statistics

Club

International

Statistics accurate as of match played 15 June 2021

Honours

Club
Nasaf
 Uzbek League runner-up (1): 2017
 Uzbek Cup (1): 2015
 Uzbek Cup runner-up (2): 2013, 2016
 Uzbekistan Super Cup (1): 2016

International
 AFC U-23 Championship: 2018

Individual
 AFC U-23 Championship Most Valuable Player: 2018

References

1996 births
Living people
Association football midfielders
Uzbekistani footballers
Uzbekistani expatriate footballers
Uzbekistan youth international footballers
Uzbekistan international footballers
FC Nasaf players
Pakhtakor Tashkent FK players
Shabab Al-Ahli Club players
Uzbekistan Super League players
UAE Pro League players
Footballers at the 2018 Asian Games
2019 AFC Asian Cup players
Asian Games competitors for Uzbekistan
Expatriate footballers in the United Arab Emirates
Uzbekistani expatriate sportspeople in the United Arab Emirates